Tobaccoville is a village in Forsyth and Stokes counties in the U.S. state of North Carolina. The population was 2,209 at the 2020 census. While a Tobaccoville post office was established in 1887, the village was not incorporated until 1991, as a defense against forced annexation of the area by the nearby city of King.

History
The Old Richmond Schoolhouse and Gymnasium was listed on the National Register of Historic Places in 2009.

Geography
Tobaccoville is located in northwestern Forsyth County at  (36.230502, -80.363261). Small portions of the village limits extend north into Stokes County.

Demographics

2020 census

As of the 2020 United States census, there were 2,578 people, 1,074 households, and 762 families residing in the village.

2000 census
As of the census of 2000, there were 2,209 people, 889 households, and 661 families residing in the village. The population density was 311.6 people per square mile (120.3/km). There were 944 housing units at an average density of 133.1 per square mile (51.4/km). The racial makeup of the village was 95.07% White, 4.16% African American, 0.18% Asian, 0.14% from other races, and 0.45% from two or more races. Hispanic or Latino of any race were 0.77% of the population.

There were 889 households, out of which 32.6% had children under the age of 18 living with them, 65.0% were married couples living together, 7.1% had a female householder with no husband present, and 25.6% were non-families. 21.6% of all households were made up of individuals, and 8.0% had someone living alone who was 65 years of age or older. The average household size was 2.48 and the average family size was 2.89.

In the village, the population was spread out, with 24.0% under the age of 18, 6.5% from 18 to 24, 31.6% from 25 to 44, 27.3% from 45 to 64, and 10.6% who were 65 years of age or older. The median age was 39 years. For every 100 females, there were 97.1 males. For every 100 females age 18 and over, there were 93.9 males.

The median income for a household in the village was $48,233, and the median income for a family was $56,034. Males had a median income of $34,554 versus $27,288 for females. The per capita income for the village was $21,620. About 3.4% of families and 5.2% of the population were below the poverty line, including 5.7% of those under age 18 and 9.2% of those age 65 or over.

Education
Tobaccoville is served by the Winston-Salem/Forsyth County School System.  Old Richmond Elementary, rebuilt in 1978, is the current elementary school that serves students in grades K-5.  Northwest Middle School serves the 6-8 grades while North Forsyth High School primarily serves students in grades 9-12.  Tobaccoville has a very strong alumni base from North Forsyth.  Newly constructed Ronald Reagan High School in Pfafftown also serves many students who live in Tobaccoville.  Other schools that serve the citizens of Tobaccoville are Vienna Elementary in Winston-Salem, Rural Hall Elementary, East Bend Elementary, Forbush High School, West Stokes High School, South Stokes High School, Woodland Christian School, Old Town Elementary School, King Elementary, Calvary Christian School, and Forsyth Country Day School.

References

External links
 Village of Tobaccoville official website

Villages in Forsyth County, North Carolina
Villages in Stokes County, North Carolina
Villages in North Carolina
Populated places established in 1991
1991 establishments in North Carolina